Rajendra Yadav (28 August 1929 – 28 October 2013) was a Hindi fiction writer, and a pioneer of the 'Nayi Kahani' movement of Hindi literature. 
He edited the literary magazine HANS, which was founded by Munshi Premchand in 1930 but ceased publication in 1953 – Yadav relaunched it on 31st July 1986, (Premchand's Birthday).

His wife Manu Bhandari was a notable Hindi writer and novelist.

Biography
Rajendra Yadav was born in Agra, Uttar Pradesh on 28 August 1929. He received his early education at Agra, and later also studied at Mawana, Meerut. He graduated in 1949, and later completed his MA in Hindi at Agra University in 1951.

His first novel was Pret Bolte Hain (Ghosts Speak), published in 1951 and later retitled as Sara Akash (The Infinite Cosmos) in the 1960s. It was the first Hindi novel to try to shock orthodox Indian cultural traditions. It was adapted into a movie of the same title, Sara Akash, by Basu Chatterjee in 1969 and which along with Mrinal Sen's Bhuvan Shome, launched Parallel Cinema in Hindi. The films were shot at the Yadav's ancestral home in Raja Ki Mandi, Agra.

Ukhre Huey Log, ('The Rootless People) his next novel, depicts the trauma of a couple arising out of socio-economic condition which forced them to desert the conventional path – and, still they failed to acclimatise themselves to a corrupt and devilish world. This novel envisages "living in" concept for the first time.

He wrote two more novels, Kulta (The Wayward Wife), and Shaah aur Maat (Check and Mate). He also wrote several stories and translated into Hindi many works of Russian language writers like Turgenev, Chekhov, and Lermontov (A Hero of Our Times), as also Albert Camus (The Outsider).

Ek Inch Muskaan (A Little Smile), which Rajendra Yadav and wife Mannu Bhandari wrote together, is a love tragedy of schizophrenic individuals.

Besides being a writer, Rajendra Yadav was also a nominated board member of Prasar Bharti in 1999–2001.
He was awarded Yash Bharati Award of year 2013 by  Government of Uttar Pradesh.

Yadav died in New Delhi  on 28 October 2013. He was 84 years old when he died. Before his death, he had been admitted to hospital as he was ailing .

Career

Writing 
Yadav, along with fellow Hindi writers Kamleshwar and Mohan Rakesh was one of the early pioneers of the Nayi Kahani (New Story) movement in Hindi literature. His early fiction focused on the lives of the middle class, and often touched upon political issues.

Editing 
As editor of Hans, a monthly literary magazine in Hindi, Yadav encouraged writing on themes surrounding questions of inequality and poverty. In his editorials for Hans, he often wrote about issues concerning feminism and Dalit empowerment, and encouraged contributions to the magazine from Dalit and women writers. His frank style occasionally courted controversy and he was once the subject of litigation after statements made by him were alleged to offend religious sentiments. He was a strong advocate of freedom of expression and expressed the opinion that the refusal of Hindi writer-editors to publish good, but controversial, literature, had directly led to the flourishing of little magazines that would publish such works.

Selected bibliography
 DIXANT RANA hastag bhai bhai , 2006
  NONU TONU  , 2015
 Ukhre Huey Log, (The Rootless People)
 Kulta (The Wayward Wife)
 Shaah aur Maat (Check and Mate).
 Strangers on the Roof, tr. by Ruth Vanita. 1994, Penguin, .
 Ek Inch Muskaan (A Little Smile), with Manu Bhandari.

References

External links
 About Rajendra Yadav, at Hans magazine website
 Rajendra Yadav, at E-Magazine Shabdankan

 In search of roots, by Rajendra Yadav
 Two in the next world, by Rajendra Yadav
 Roushni Kahan Hai, A Story by Rajendra Yadav
 Poems by Rajendra Yadav

Hindi-language writers
Indian magazine editors
Indian male essayists
1929 births
2013 deaths
People from Agra
Novelists from Uttar Pradesh
People from Noida
Translators from Russian
Translators from English
Translators to Hindi
Indian male novelists
20th-century Indian novelists
Dr. Bhimrao Ambedkar University alumni
20th-century Indian translators
20th-century Indian essayists
20th-century Indian male writers